The legal drinking age in India and the laws which regulate the sale and consumption of alcohol vary significantly from state to state. In India, consumption of alcohol is prohibited in the states of Bihar, Gujarat, Nagaland, and Mizoram, as well as the union territory of Lakshadweep. There is partial ban on alcohol in some districts of Manipur. All other Indian states permit alcohol consumption but fix a legal drinking age, which ranges at different ages per region. In some states the legal drinking age can be different for different types of alcoholic beverage.

In spite of legal restrictions, alcohol consumption in India has risen over 55% over a period of 20 years (according to OECD figures) as the laws are generally not followed in a customer business relationship. The maximum permitted ABV is 45.5%.

History 
The Prohibition on Alcohol was firstly in 1954 by Morarji Desai who was Chief Minister of Bombay Province. The Prohibition was imposed on the Koli people who were traditional distillers of alcohol or wine in Maharashtra mostly in Dharavi. Kolis of Bombay distilled the alcohol by Jamun, Guava, Orange, Apple and Chikoo. In 1954, Morarji Desai imposed the Prohibition on liquor but there was a strong protest by Koli community and there were rallies far and wide by Koli people. Kolis alleged the Desai that 'This is not a Daru-Bandi, This is Desh-Bandi' because Desai selling the foreign alcohol in state but prohibited our homemade liquor. before the prohibition on alcohol, Kolis of Dharavi manufactured the alcohol legally and when prohibition enacted, commercial alcohol production ceased and Kolis had a virtual monopoly  in thus area.

Law
Alcohol is a subject in the State List under the Seventh Schedule of the Constitution of India. Therefore, the laws governing alcohol vary from state to state.

Liquor in India is generally sold at liquor stores, restaurants, hotels, bars, pubs, clubs and discos but not online. Some states, like Kerala and Tamil Nadu, prohibit private parties from owning liquor stores making the state government the sole retailer of alcohol in those states. In some states, liquor may be sold at groceries, departmental stores, banquet halls and/or farm houses. Some tourist areas have special laws allowing the sale of alcohol on beaches and houseboats.

Home delivery of alcoholic beverages is illegal in Delhi. However, in Delhi home delivery of beer and wine by private vendors and departmental stores is permitted.

Legal drinking age by states and union territories

Drunk driving law
The blood alcohol content (BAC) legal limit is 0.03% or 0.03 mg alcohol in 100 ml blood.

On 1 March 2012, the Union Cabinet approved proposed changes to the Motor Vehicle Act. Higher penalties were introduced, including fines from 2,000 to 10,000 and imprisonment from 6 months to 4 years. Different penalties are assessed depending on the blood alcohol content at the time of the offence.

Dry days

Dry days are specific days when the sale of alcohol is not allowed. Most of the Indian states observe these days on major national festivals/occasions such as Republic Day (26 January), Independence Day (15 August) and Gandhi Jayanti (2 October). Dry days are also observed during elections in India.

Dry days by states and union territories

No dry day rule is applicable for 5-star hotels, clubs and resorts in West Bengal. Drinks may be served and consumed in those places in West Bengal even on "dry days". Private consumption too is allowed on the said "dry days". Only the open sale of liquor at restaurants, liquor shops and other permitted places is disallowed on those days.

Prohibited days are also announced when elections are held in the state. For Lok Sabha or Vidhan Sabha elections, Prohibited days are declared for 48 hours prior to the close of voting, plus during the counting day(s). For Municipality, Panchayat, Municipal Corporation, or Darjeeling Gorkha Hill Council elections, Prohibited days occur on the polling day, the previous day and the counting day(s).

Andaman and Nicobar Islands

Retail shops are closed on every month on the 7th, which is the pay day / salary day in this union territory, and on 2nd & 4th Tuesdays of every month. Plus, a maximum of two fulls or four beers are permitted per person for sale in retail shops.

Delhi
Every excise year, the Government of Delhi, notifies the number of Prohibited days in a year. The three national holidays—26 January 2 October and 15 August, are always prohibited days, and additional prohibited days are announced at the start of the excise year (1 July).

†Festival date may be in either month.

Jammu and Kashmir

Jammu

†Festival date may be in either month.

Kashmir

†Festival date may be in either month.

Karnataka

Kerala

Sundays are no longer observed as Prohibited days in the state.

1st Day of English Calendar Every month for administrative purposes and on the grounds that it is the salary day. Dry days are observed on the day of polling and the previous day during elections as well.

†Date may be in either month.

Maharashtra

The district collector can also designate any day as a Prohibited day by giving seven days' notice. his list may vary depending on the date of festivals as well as specific Prohibited day announcements by the Government of Maharashtra.

†Festival date may be in June or July.

Rajasthan

†Festival date may be in either month.

Tamil Nadu

†Leap year)(will vary based on Tamil calendar.

West Bengal

See also

 India alcohol related
 Alcohol prohibition in India
 Dry Days in India
 Kasauli Brewery, India's first European-style brewery still in operation
 Solan brewery

 Alcoholic Indian beverages
 Beer in India 
 Desi daru
 Indian-made foreign liquor
 Indian whisky
 Lion beer, Asia'a first beer brand
 Solan No. 1, India's first malt whisky
 Old Monk, iconic Indian rum
 Sura

References

India
 
India law-related lists
Alcohol in India
Indian cuisine-related lists